Southwell School, is an independent co-educational Anglican boarding and day school set in 32 acres of park like grounds in central Hamilton, New Zealand. Southwell offers education to children aged 5 to 13 years. A number of international students attend the school.

In November 1911, Mr Cecil Ernest Ferris started Southwell School with one boy, Robert Oliver, and later, Vernon Wilkinson, at Allington Homestead which is now the site of Melville High School.* In 1912 three D’Oyly Snow brothers joined the School, which was then held in a small building beside St Peter's Hall.  By 1913 the roll had grown to twelve and the School had moved to Hukanui Road.  In 1917 Mr H G Sergel became Headmaster and the School moved to Opoia Road, by the railway bridge on River Road.  Every Sunday the students walked to St Peter's Church. In 1921 the School moved to its present site on Peachgrove Road.  The Sergel Family owned the school until 1963, when they transferred it to an independent Educational Trust, to be administered by a Trust Board.

Specialist facilities
Southwell School has modern purpose built facilities for teaching subjects including: math, English, science, social science, art, pottery, drama, performing arts, languages (French, Chinese), music, technology, and sport.

Sport
Options include: rugby, football, hockey, cricket, tennis, touch, netball, cycling, softball, water polo, gymnastics, chess, cross country, swimming, athletics

Notable alumni
 Daniel Gillies - actor
 Rt.Hon Sir Doug Graham - former Cabinet Minister
 Lance Hohaia - New Zealand and Warriors rugby league player
 Tuheitia Paki - current Maori King
 Rt.Hon Simon Upton - former Cabinet Minister and Rhodes Scholar
 Quinn Tupaea - All Black

Notable former staff
Maurice Marshall, Headmaster, Olympic & Commonwealth Games athlete

References

Boarding schools in New Zealand
Educational institutions established in 1911
Primary schools in New Zealand
Schools in Hamilton, New Zealand
Anglican schools in New Zealand
1911 establishments in New Zealand